Limor Son Har-Melech (born 1979) is an Israeli politician and activist who serves as a member of Knesset for Otzma Yehudit following the 2022 Israeli legislative election.

Biography
Har-Melech was born in Jerusalem in 1979. In 2001, she married her first husband Shuli Har-Melech and moved with him to Homesh, a settlement administered by Is rael in the disputed West Bank region, where he was a medic and an ambulance driver, and they had a son together. In August 2003, while Har-Melech was seven months pregnant with her second child and in a car with her husband, five gunmen fired upon their vehicle with automatic weapons and the vehicle rolled over. Shuli died instantly, whilst Limor was in a critical condition and her daughter was born prematurely by caesarean section several hours later. Al-Aqsa Martyrs' Brigades, a terrorist organization described as the military wing of the Palestinian political party Fatah, claimed responsibility for the attack.

In 2005, Har-Melech and her family, along with the rest of the residents of Homesh, were evicted from their homes due to the Israeli disengagement from Gaza and some West Bank towns, with her home being demolished. Har-Melech remarried to her current husband Yehuda, and had a further eight children with him, moving out of temporary accommodation into a house in Shavei Shomron after her seventh child. She co-founded the grassroots organization Homesh First, which seeks to re-build the town she had lived in until 2005.

Political career
Har-Melech was thirteenth on the joint Religious Zionist Party-Otzma Yehudit list in the 2022 Israeli legislative election, which won fourteen mandates, thereby ensuring her election to the Knesset.

Present in the Palestinian town of Huwara after a punitive expedition by Israelis settlers in february 2023, she called on the government "not to issue condemnations and appeals for calm".

References

1979 births
Living people
Jewish Israeli politicians
Members of the 25th Knesset (2022–)
Otzma Yehudit politicians
Women members of the Knesset